In mathematics, specifically in symplectic geometry, the symplectic cut is a geometric modification on symplectic manifolds. Its effect is to decompose a given manifold into two pieces. There is an inverse operation, the symplectic sum, that glues two manifolds together into one. The symplectic cut can also be viewed as a generalization of symplectic blow up. The cut was introduced in 1995 by Eugene Lerman, who used it to study the symplectic quotient and other operations on manifolds.

Topological description 

Let  be any symplectic manifold and

Assume furthermore that  is fibered in circles, each of which is an integral curve of the induced Hamiltonian vector field.

Under these assumptions,  is a manifold with boundary , and one can form a manifold

by collapsing each circle fiber to a point.

Sometimes it is useful to view the two halves of the symplectic cut as being joined along their shared submanifold  to produce a singular space

For example, this singular space is the central fiber in the symplectic sum regarded as a deformation.

Symplectic description 

The preceding description is rather crude; more care is required to keep track of the symplectic structure on the symplectic cut. For this, let  be any symplectic manifold.

This moment map can be viewed as a Hamiltonian function that generates the circle action.

The group  acts on the product in a Hamiltonian way by

with moment map

and the circle.

The manifold  inherits the Hamiltonian circle action, as do its two submanifolds just described. So one may form the symplectic quotient

By construction, it contains  as a dense open submanifold; essentially, it compactifies this open manifold with the symplectic quotient

 

One constructs , the other half of the symplectic cut, in a symmetric manner.

The existence of a global Hamiltonian circle action on  appears to be a restrictive assumption. However, it is not actually necessary; the cut can be performed under more general hypotheses, such as a local Hamiltonian circle action near  (since the cut is a local operation).

Blow up as cut 

When a complex manifold  is blown up along a submanifold , the blow up locus  is replaced by an exceptional divisor  and the rest of the manifold is left undisturbed. Topologically, this operation may also be viewed as the removal of an -neighborhood of the blow up locus, followed by the collapse of the boundary by the Hopf map.

Blowing up a symplectic manifold is more subtle, since the symplectic form must be adjusted in a neighborhood of the blow up locus in order to continue smoothly across the exceptional divisor in the blow up. The symplectic cut is an elegant means of making the neighborhood-deletion/boundary-collapse process symplectically rigorous.

As before, let  be a symplectic manifold with a Hamiltonian -action with moment map .

References 

 Eugene Lerman: Symplectic cuts, Mathematical Research Letters 2 (1995), 247–258
 Dusa McDuff and D. Salamon: Introduction to Symplectic Topology (1998) Oxford Mathematical Monographs, .

Symplectic topology